Karl Reiniger (9 April 1910 – 25 May 1995) was a Swiss racewalker. He competed in the men's 50 kilometres walk at the 1936 Summer Olympics.

References

External links
 

1910 births
1995 deaths
Athletes (track and field) at the 1936 Summer Olympics
Swiss male racewalkers
Olympic athletes of Switzerland
Place of birth missing